Christian de Boisredon (born 2 February 1974) writer, social entrepreneur in the media field

Founder of Sparknews (including Impact Journalism Day and Solutions&Co). Also named Ashoka Fellow in 2014 for Sparknews.

Summary

After his studies in agronomy, he embarked on a "world tour of hope", in order to encounter those who are truly changing the world. The book published from this experience became a best-seller, convincing him that positive information deserves to be shared. After several years of strategic consulting and change management for Arthur-Andersen (now Bearingpoint), he started his social enterprise (Sparknews) to source innovative solutions, showcase them in the media and connect them with the corporate world. Impact Journalism Day is one of Sparknews' project, which federates 50 leading international newsrooms and reaches 120 million readers.

The World Hope Tour
Christian de Boisredon was born in 1974. When he was 24, he travelled around the world, looking for men and women who were moving the world forward.
After this “World Hope Tour”, the book written by Christian and his two travel companions (L’Espérance Autour du Monde, ed Pocket at Vivendi Universal Publisher) became a bestseller and was translated into several languages.
The preface was signed by Dominique Lapierre (City of Joy, O Jerusalem!, Freedom at Midnight...) and Céline Dion.
This project was the first socially responsible world tour and was the catalyst for a wave of socially engaged travel.

The launch of the book organized by Christian brought together 3500 people who each paid 10 euros to be at the launch conference: a first in the world of publishing in France. This confirmed the public's deep interest in the subject. The book quickly became the third biggest seller on Amazon and appeared on several bestseller lists.

The book initiated an important wave of engagement: a lot of readers who were touched by the story left to work on the projects described in the book, especially for microcredit banks.

Reporters d'Espoirs
While a consultant in strategy and change management in the consulting firm BearingPoint (ex Arthur Andersen), he co-founded in 2003 a social business, Reporters of Hope (Reporters d’Espoirs), and encouraged a large group of media CEOs (TV, Radio, Press and Internet...) to focus on solution-based information.
The first event united important figures of the press at the headquarters of UNESCO with more than 1200 opinion leaders and more than 350 journalists and editors.

Christian de Boisredon, passed on the presidency to Pierre Nougué and the managing role to a CEO in 2007 in order to focus on his other projects. Christian quit the board of the organization he created for strategy divergences.

The Yunus Movie Project
In 2006, Christian de Boisredon co-founded a production company to produce a feature film based on the life of Professor Muhammad Yunus, inventor of Microcredit. Two months later, the latter won the Nobel Peace Prize.
Phyllida Lloyd, the director of The Iron Lady (starring Meryl Streep) and Mamma Mia! (the biggest hit ever made by a female director and 5th biggest hit of 2008) is attached to the project as well as David Thompson, former head of BBC Films and Tessa Ross, head of Film 4 and coproducer of Slumdog Millionnaire among other films.
The project is on stand by for political reasons in Bangladesh.

Sparknews
In 2011, Christian de Boisredon created a social business start-up with a similar underlying philosophy to "Reporters d'Espoirs" but with an international approach. Sparknews started as a TV and press reports aggregator focused on solution based content. The site has been launched on May 31, 2012 at an event organized with the Global Editors Network, during the news World Summit, gathering 400 international editors in chief. 
Since then, Sparknews has created Impact Journalism Day where 50 leading newspapers from 4 continents publish together a supplement dedicated to solution based stories. The reach is 120 million readers and the news papers are Le Monde, The Sunday Times, La Stampa, the Times of India, Asahi Shimbun...

Speaker
Christian frequently appears as a speaker in the media and at conferences: OECD, UNESCO, Global Entrepreneurship week, Danone, Leroy Merlin, BNP-Paribas, L'Oréal, EDF, Science-po, HEC, ESCP, etc.

References

External links
 Sparknews
 Impact Journalism Day

Agricultural engineers
20th-century French journalists
21st-century French journalists
1974 births
People from Saint-Germain-en-Laye
Living people
French male non-fiction writers
Ashoka Fellows